Oscar Aagaard (July 4, 1855 – May 4, 1936) was a Norwegian writer. Oscar Aagaard was the brother of the priest and author Gustav Aagaard (1852–1927).

Works
 Paa Streiftog (In the Foray, 1893)
 Underlige fyre (Strange Guys, 1894)
 Fru Junos salon (Mrs. Juno's Salon, 1895)
 Farlige farvande (Dangerous Waters, 1896)
 Kaptein Heire og hans gutter (Captain Heire and His Boys, 1898)
 Martin Ligeglads meriter (Martin Ligeglad's Merits, 1899)
 Arboe & søn (Arboe & Son, 1900)
 Kakerlaker (Cockroaches, 1904)
 Kongen i kjælderen (The King in the Cellar, 1906)
 Hjertets Melodier (Melodies of the Heart, 1908)

References

1855 births
1936 deaths
People from Sandefjord
Norwegian novelists
19th-century Norwegian male writers
20th-century Norwegian male writers